Sukhur-e Rashid may refer to:
 Sukhur-e Rashid-e Olya
 Sukhur-e Rashid-e Sofla